Begonia sikkimensis is a species of flowering plant in the family Begoniaceae, native to Tibet, Nepal, the eastern Himalayas, Assam, and Myanmar. With its highly dissected leaves it resembles Begonia U614, but that as yet undescribed species is rhizomatous, and Begonia sikkimensis is caulescent.

Subtaxa
The following varieties are accepted:
Begonia sikkimensis var. kamengensis Rekha Morris, P.D.McMillan & Golding
Begonia sikkimensis var. sikkimensis

References

sikkimensis
Flora of Tibet
Flora of Nepal
Flora of East Himalaya
Flora of Assam (region)
Flora of Myanmar
Plants described in 1859